Gabriel Badilla Segura (June 30, 1984 – November 20, 2016) was a Costa Rican footballer who played as a defender.

Club career
Badilla began his career with Deportivo Saprissa, with whom he won two national championships as well as a UNCAF Cup title and a CONCACAF Champions Cup title. He was part of the team that played the 2005 FIFA Club World Championship Toyota Cup and finished third behind São Paulo and Liverpool

Badilla signed for New England Revolution on August 18, 2008. He became an important part of the Revolution backline as the 2008 season progressed.

Badilla was released by New England on March 24, 2010.

International career
Badilla was the captain of the Costa Rica national team that played in the 2001 FIFA U-17 World Championship held in Trinidad and Tobago He played for the senior Costa Rica national football team since 2005, including one appearance at the 2006 FIFA World Cup in Germany. He made his debut in a friendly against China on June 19, 2005.

He appeared in one match for Costa Rica at the 2005 CONCACAF Gold Cup and four matches at the 2007 CONCACAF Gold Cup. Most recently, Badilla has played in two qualifying matches for the 2010 FIFA World Cup.

Personal life
In 2013, Badilla underwent successful surgery to remove a benign tumor from his heart.

Death
On November 20, 2016, Badilla was participating in a local marathon known as Lindora Run. Shortly before reaching the finish line, Badilla collapsed. After a long attempt to revive him, he was declared dead due to a cardiorespiratory arrest.

References

External links
 MLS player profile
 
 Profile at Nacion.com 
 Profile - Saprissa

1984 births
2016 deaths
Footballers from San José, Costa Rica
Association football defenders
Costa Rican footballers
Costa Rica international footballers
Deportivo Saprissa players
New England Revolution players
2005 CONCACAF Gold Cup players
2006 FIFA World Cup players
2007 CONCACAF Gold Cup players
Costa Rican expatriate footballers
Expatriate soccer players in the United States
Major League Soccer players
Sport deaths in Costa Rica